Hank Shanks is an American former Negro league first baseman who played in the 1920s.

Shanks played for the Birmingham Black Barons in 1927. In nine recorded games, he posted six hits and two RBI in 25 plate appearances.

References

External links
 and Seamheads

Year of birth missing
Place of birth missing
Birmingham Black Barons players